The 1919 Reuss-Gera state election was held on 2 February 1919 to elect the 21 members of the Landtag of Reuss-Gera.

Results

References 

Reuss
Elections in Thuringia